The 1903 Kansas State Aggies football team represented Kansas State Agricultural College during the 1903 college football season.

Schedule

References

https://www.kstatesports.com/sports/football/schedule/1903

Kansas State
Kansas State Wildcats football seasons
Kansas State Aggies football